Kazi Kamrul Islam (born 12 October 1987) is a Bangladeshi first-class cricketer who has played for Chittagong Division from the 2005–06 Bangladeshi cricket season.

References

External links

1987 births
Living people
Bangladeshi cricketers
Chittagong Division cricketers
Bangladesh East Zone cricketers
Place of birth missing (living people)
21st-century Bangladeshi people